Inspiral (foaled 14 March 2019) is a British Thoroughbred racehorse. She was one of the leading two-year-olds in Europe in 2021 when she was unbeaten in four races including the Star Stakes, May Hill Stakes and Fillies' Mile.

Background
Inspiral is a bay filly with a white blaze bred and owned by the Newmarket-based Cheveley Park Stud. She was sent into training with John and Thady Gosden at Clarehaven Stables.

She was from the sixth crop of foals sired by Frankel, an undefeated racehorse whose other progeny have included Cracksman, Adayar, Soul Stirring and Hurricane Lane. Inspiral's dam Starscope won only one minor race but was a top-class performer who finished second in both the 1000 Guineas and the Coronation Stakes. Starscope's dam Moon Goddess was a half-sister to Medicean and a descendant of the broodmare Life Hill, making her a distant relative of Sherluck and Caro.

Racing career

2021: two-year-old season
Inspiral made her track debut in a maiden race over seven furlongs at Newmarket Racecourse on 26 June when she was ridden by Robert Havlin and started the 2/1 joint-favourite. After starting slowly she made steady progress in the last quarter mile, gained the advantage in the closing stages and won by one and a half lengths from Ardbraccan and Calm Skies. Frankie Dettori took over from Havlin when the filly was stepped up in class and started favourite for the Listed Star Stakes at Sandown Park on 22 July. After being restrained in the early stages Inspiral went to the front approaching the final furlong and drew away to win "comfortably" by three and a half lengths from Wild Beauty (later to win the Natalma Stakes). John Gosden commented "She's always been a classy filly. She'd done normal work at home on the bridle and won very nicely at Newmarket... She’s never been in front like that before, so she's done well... She'd shown a lot of ability and I thought she'd enjoy the track here. She'll have no problem getting a mile... she has a big frame, so she doesn't want over-racing this year."

On 9 September at Doncaster Racecourse Inspiral went off at odds of 2/9 for the Group 2 May Hill Stakes over one mile on good to firm ground. She tracked the leaders before going to the front inside the last quarter mile and won "readily" by three and three quarter lengths from Prosperous Voyage despite being eased down by Dettori near the finish. After the race Thady Gosden said "She’s done it very well. Obviously there were a few good fillies in the race and the ground was probably a bit too quick for her, but she showed plenty of class. She an exceptional filly, but if you see her walking around here she’s still got plenty of growing to do, so we’d be hopeful she’ll progress through the winter."

For her final run of the season Inspiral was moved up to Group 1 class for the Fillies' Mile at Newmarket on 8 October when she was again partnered by Dettori. She started the 8/11 favourite in a nine-runner field which also included Wild Beauty, Prosperous Voyage, Mise En Scene (Prestige Stakes), Concert Hall (Weld Park Stakes), Magical Lagoon (Flame of Tara Stakes) and Majestic Glory (Sweet Solera Stakes). After racing towards the rear of the field in the early stages she took the lead approaching the final furlong and pulled away to win by two and a half lengths with Prosperous Voyage taking second place again. John Gosden said "Inspiral is improving with her racing and was pretty professional today. She's a big girl but she's getting stronger all the time. We'll see how she comes through the winter as regards to next year but if we have a cold one with those east winds we could go straight for the 1000 Guineas. She'll get a mile and a quarter no problem."

On 10 November Inspiral was named Champion Two-year-old Filly at the Cartier Racing Awards.

Pedigree

Inspiral is inbred 3 × 4 to Rainbow Quest, meaning that this stallion appears in both the third and fourth generations of he pedigree.

References

2019 racehorse births
Racehorses bred in the United Kingdom
Racehorses trained in the United Kingdom
Thoroughbred family 3-o
Cartier Award winners